Villa Clara dominated the 22nd Cuban National Series, outdistancing Citricultores by seven games in the 51-game season.

Standings

References

 (Note - text is printed in a white font on a white background, depending on browser used.)

Cuban National Series seasons
Base
Base
1983 in baseball